Frank Jaeger, better known by his codename Gray Fox, is a fictional character and protagonist from Konami's Metal Gear series. Created by Hideo Kojima and designed by Yoji Shinkawa, he first appears in the series' original 1987 game Metal Gear, and is one of the few characters to appear in both the original 2D games and the later 3D games. First introduced in the original game as a high-ranking agent of FOXHOUND who goes missing during a mission to Outer Heaven, he is saved by fellow FOXHOUND agent Solid Snake but goes missing during the original game and its sequel Metal Gear 2: Solid Snake during which he is revealed to have sided with Big Boss; he is eventually defeated and left for dead. The character is reintroduced in Metal Gear Solid as the Cyborg Ninja, a mysterious being wearing a powered armor exoskeleton and armed with a high-frequency blade. During Liquid Snake's FOXHOUND revolt at Shadow Moses, he confronts Solid Snake on several occasions, while also providing advice via CODEC as a faceless contact named Deepthroat. Metal Gear Solid: Portable Ops, set twenty-five years before the original Metal Gear, also features his teenage iteration using the codename Null.

The character was positively received by critics, and is considered one of the best characters in Metal Gear; he is also frequently mentioned as one of the best ninjas in video gaming.

Appearances
The original Metal Gear game introduces  as a high-ranking agent of FOXHOUND as the "Fox" codename being the highest distinction within the unit. His face portrait in the MSX2 version was modeled after actor Tom Berenger. Prior to the game's events, Fox goes missing during a mission to Outer Heaven with his last transmission being a cryptic message simply saying "Metal Gear". After being rescued by Solid Snake, Fox reveals TX-55 Metal Gear's true nature to the player.

Metal Gear 2: Solid Snake revealed that Gray Fox left FOXHOUND and defected to Zanzibar Land. Fox pilots the advanced model Metal Gear D and confronts Solid Snake a few times, while secretly assisting Snake as an anonymous informant. Fox's past is fleshed out in this game; his civilian identity  is revealed to have a relationship with former Czech figure skater Gustava Heffner (Natasha Marcova in the MSX2 version) after they met in Calgary and fell in love. Gustava tried to seek asylum with him in America, but failed and was stripped of her competition rights as a result. Following this incident, Frank developed a great deal of resentment toward his superiors, but was unaware that Gustava later joined the StB and is present in Zanzibar as Dr. Kio Marv's bodyguard. During his and Snake's first direct encounter as enemies, Fox's piloting of the Metal Gear accidentally causes Gustava's death. After Snake destroys Metal Gear, Fox challenges Snake to a fistfight in the middle of a minefield and is apparently killed.

According to Hideo Kojima, "cyborg ninja was born from this Shin-chan's graffiti." During Liquid Snake's FOXHOUND revolt of Shadow Moses, Fox once again challenges Solid Snake to a fight, maiming Revolver Ocelot and scaring Otacon in the process. After the fight, he becomes erratic and disappears in a violent rage. Throughout the game, he provides Snake cryptic advice via CODEC as a faceless contact calling himself "Deepthroat". Naomi Hunter eventually divulges being Fox's foster sister as well as his Cyborg Ninja identity to Snake. Later, during Snake's battle with Metal Gear REX, Fox reveals that he killed Naomi's parents and, feeling remorse, became her step brother. Fox fights REX and manages to destroy its radome with the use of a prototype railgun attached to his arm. However, Fox is mortally wounded and begs Snake to kill him and destroy REX with a stinger, but Snake refuses to shoot. Saying goodbye to his comrade, he is killed by Liquid (piloting REX).

Raiden initially thought that the Cyborg Ninja in Metal Gear Solid 2: Sons of Liberty seen during Solidus Snake's Manhattan incident was Gray Fox before learning that the person in question is actually Olga Gurlukovich.

The second prequel Metal Gear Solid: Portable Ops (set twenty-five years before Metal Gear) featured a teenage version of the character under the codename , a masked machete-wielding assassin. Null is subjected to a secret CIA project to be the "Perfect Soldier" and recruited into Gene's corrupt FOX unit during the San Hieronymo takeover. During the game, Null fights with Big Boss (Naked Snake) twice. During the second fight, Big Boss realized that Null was a boy in Mozambique that used his innocence as a cover to kill dozens of government soldiers with only one knife while speaking a little German, thus how he was deemed "Frank Jaeger" (German for "Frank Hunter"). After defeating Null, Big Boss sent Null to somewhere outside of FOX for help.

Metal Gear Solid 4: Guns of the Patriots reveals that Frank Jaeger's murder of Para-Medic was part of Big Mama's plan to free Big Boss from Zero's control.

Other appearances
There is a Cyborg Ninja unique character card in Metal Gear Acid. Outside of the Metal Gear games, the Cyborg Ninja is featured as a player character driver in Konami Krazy Racers and as an Assist Trophy in both Super Smash Bros. Brawl and Super Smash Bros. Ultimate.

A Cyborg Ninja figure was released by McFarlane Toys in 1998. Another figure was released by Konami in 2004. In 2007, a block-style figure was also released in the Kubrick line. In 2011, another Cyborg Ninja figure, as designed by Kojima himself, was announced to come from Square Enix's Play Arts Kai line of Metal Gear figures, and was released for the 25th anniversary of the Metal Gear series.

Metal Gear Rising: Revengeance features Gray Fox's Cyborg Ninja exoskeleton and sword as a downloadable content skin and weapon for Raiden.

In 2013, Kojima stated to be interested in developing a game with Gray Fox as the main playable character, although he does not assure it to happen.

Reception

The character was very well received by critics. In 2008, IGN ranked Gray Fox as both the third top Metal Gear villain ("whether players are rescuing Gray Fox, battling against him, or watching gleefully as he rips entire rooms of soldiers to shreds, Gray Fox never fails to impress") and the fourth best boss to battle in the series. That same year, Destructoid's Chad Concelmo also placed him twice on the list of ten best Metal Gear bosses, as ninth (in Metal Gear 2) and seventh (in Metal Gear Solid, making "one of the greatest returns in videogame history"). In 2013, Sam Smith of PLAY ranked Gray Fox as the ninth best character in the series, noting that he "remains one of Metal Gear'''s most popular and iconic characters."Complex put Cyborg Ninja at number sixth on the list of characters they wished to see in Super Smash Bros. 4, adding, "the Metal Gear Solid series has plenty of other characters to choose from, but we think the Cyborg Ninja would be the perfect selection." The return of Gray Fox as a playable character in Metal Gear Rising: Revengeance was requested by several publications, including EGM, Shacknews and ScrewAttack.Andrew Yoon, Metal Gear Rising: Revengeance DLC could offer new playable character, Shacknews, June 18, 2012.

He was also frequently featured in the lists of top ten fictional ninja characters in video gaming (and sometimes in all fiction), including by Virgin Media, Nich Maragos and David Smith of 1UP.com in 2004 (ranked fifth), Devin Coldeway of CrunchGear in 2008 (ranked ninth), Unreality in 2009 (ranked second), Nintendo Power, Chris Jager of GamePro (ranked fourth), and ScrewAttack (ranked second) in 2010, Becky Cunningham of Cheat Code Central in 2011 (ranked fifth), and the staff of PLAY in 2013 (ranked third). Ian Dransfield of PLAY also featured him in the 2011 list top ten ninjas for PlayStation consoles, adding that although Raiden "may have completely redeemed his character", he "can never outdo" Gray Fox, and in 2012 Complex Rich Knight of ranked him as the third swiftest ninja in gaming.

In 2008, IGN's Jesse Schedeen compared Gray Fox to Vergil from the Devil May Cry series as "two formidable warriors from the videogaming realm" who both "met their unfortunate ends in the games," stating Gray Fox has "left a big mark on the Metal Gear series." The demise of Gray Fox was featured in GameSpy's 2008 article about the series' eight top moments, ranked as the ninth top cutscene in the series by Jeremy M. Loss of Joystick Division, included on the list of ten most depressing deaths in video games by Shubhankar Parijat of GamingBolt in 2011, and ranked as the seventh most "awesome and awful" character death in video games by Phil Hornshaw of GameFront that same year, and as the fourth top Metal Gear highlight by PSU.com's Mike Harradence in 2012.FHM's Gelo Gonzales placed Cyborg Ninja first on their 2009 list of most memorable hitmen in gaming, adding that he "holds the title for the deadliest ninja ever." In 2012, Matt Elliott of PlayStation Official Magazine included Gray Fox among the PlayStation's top ten scariest characters, calling him "one of the most brutally unnerving bosses ever, largely because of his jarring, staccato introduction, often at odds with linear military narrative of Snake's mission." That same year, Shelby Reiches of Cheat Code Central ranked him as the number one swordsman in gaming, commenting that "though this is more a role than an individual character, the Cyborg Ninja is a recurring reminder that, with proper preparation, sometimes a sword can'' beat a gun."

See also
List of characters in the Metal Gear series
Ninja in popular culture
Powered exoskeletons in fiction

References

External links
Ninjas in Games - Gray Fox at UGO.com

Amputee characters in video games
Characters designed by Yoji Shinkawa
Fictional criminals in video games
Cyborg characters in video games
Fictional American people in video games
Fictional child soldiers
Fictional immigrants to the United States
Fictional United States Army personnel
Fictional martial artists in video games
Fictional Central Intelligence Agency personnel
Fictional special forces personnel
Fictional super soldiers
Fictional swordfighters in video games
Fictional mass murderers
Konami antagonists
Male characters in video games
Metal Gear characters
Fictional mercenaries in video games
Fictional military personnel in video games
Ninja characters in video games
Orphan characters in video games
Fictional secret agents and spies in video games
Video game bosses
Video game characters introduced in 1987
Video game characters who can turn invisible
Video game characters who can move at superhuman speeds
Fictional characters with post-traumatic stress disorder